The First Chapter is an EP released by the power metal band Dream Evil.

Track listing

Credits
Niklas Isfeldt - Vocals
Fredrik Nordström - Guitars, Keyboards
Gus G. - Guitars
Peter Stålfors - Bass
Snowy Shaw - Drums

External links
Encyclopaedia Metallum: The Metal Archives

Dream Evil albums
2004 EPs
Century Media Records EPs